Cheyletoidea is a superfamily of mites in the order Trombidiformes. They are parasites of other arthropods and vertebrates.

References

Trombidiformes